The Joel Streeter Band is a band led by American singer-songwriter Joel Streeter. Streeter began recording in 2005 and is the founder, writer, composer, guitarist, and vocalist. The Joel Streeter Band has featured a constantly changing line-up of musicians, with Streeter being the only constant. When performing live, the band commonly comprises Joel Steeter backed by Max Delaney on electric guitar, Jerry Becker on keyboard, Jeff Symonds on bass, and Kyle Caprista on drums.

History 
In 2005, Streeter began performing under the name The Joel Streeter Band in San Francisco, California. Their first album Hear Me Out was self-released in 2006 with Jerry Becker. Bay Area radio station KFOG took note of the album, placing the song "Stay Living" on their Local Scene - Volume 4 compilation, and playing the song frequently since the summer of 2007. Tracks from Hear Me Out were also featured in the 2008 season of PBS's popular television program Roadtrip Nation.

Streeter's second album, Matador, was released in 2010. The album was again produced by Jerry Becker and features many notable Bay Area musicians including drummer Jim Bogios, a member of Counting Crows.

The Joel Streeter Band is an active member of The San Francisco Songwriters Coalition.

Members 
Joel Streeter - Vocals, Guitar
Max Delaney - Electric Guitar
Jerry Becker - Keyboard
Jeff Symonds - Bass
Kyle Caprista - Drums

Discography 
Hear Me Out (2006)
Matador (2010)

References

External links
JoelStreeter.com
Joel Streeter on MySpace
Interview with Ryan McCarthy
San Francisco Songwriters Coalition on MySpace

Musical collectives
Musical groups from San Francisco
Rock music groups from California
American pop rock music groups